Justin Parrish (born May 10, 1984) is a former American football defensive end. He played as a defensive end and linebacker for Kent State University. He was signed as a free agent by the Jacksonville Sharks in 2010. Parrish attended a workout with the Washington Redskins in 2006, but did not make the team. Parrish began his professional career with the Ohio Valley Greyhounds of United Indoor Football.

External links
 Jacksonville Sharks Bio

References

1984 births
Living people
American football defensive ends
American football linebackers
People from Prince George's County, Maryland
Players of American football from Maryland
Kent State Golden Flashes football players
Ohio Valley Greyhounds players
Wilkes-Barre/Scranton Pioneers players
Jacksonville Sharks players
Pittsburgh Power players
Orlando Predators players